Sacred Flesh is a 1999 British nunsploitation horror film. It is set in an indeterminate past, and consists of a series of loosely connected vignettes that depict pseudo-lesbian sexuality and some sado-masochistic activity.

Plot
Sister Elizabeth, the mother superior of a medieval convent, has visions of Mary Magdalene and a skeletal dead nun. Father Henry, the abbot, and his servant Richard are summoned by the convent's abbess to help with the hysteria spreading among the order.

Elizabeth recounts the confessions and fantasies of the nuns, flagellating herself and becoming excited as she does so: Sister Sarah masturbates; Sisters Mary and Helena flagellate one another and then have sex. Sister Catherine is violated by Fathers James and Peter. Finally, Sisters Jane, Teresa and Helen engage in three-way sex and violate Sister Ann after tying her to a cross. Elizabeth writhes violently in her cell and, as she dies, is tormented by visions of a crucified woman and Christ's beating Sacred Heart.

Mother Elizabeth and an (imagined) demonic Mary Magdalene (who has relapsed from sainthood, back into the sex worker the church once claimed she was) debate desire and chastity within what seems to be a heavenly antechamber. Mary remarks to Elizabeth that, as her convent is full of repressed female desire, the Mother Superior too is enveloped within this voluptuous fold. Elizabeth details four fantasy vignettes. These are interspersed with conversations between the convent's former abbess, a priest, Abbess Elizabeth, an odd dead zombie nun and an actress Eileen Daly playing the spirit of Catechism..

The sex scenes conform to standard pornographic sequencing. They each start simply and culminate in erotic release at the end. There are scenes of the full lesbian sexual gamut, which extends from episodes of individual nuns' self-stimulation to non-monogamous lesbian sex to a final nun-centered crucifix-bondage scene, with copious use of the whip and the rope.

Cast

 Sally Tremaine as Abbess Elizabeth, Mother Superior
 Moyna Cope as Former Abbess
 Simon Hill as Abbot Henry
 Kristina Bill as Mary Magdalene
 Rachel Taggart as Catechism
 Eileen Daly as Repression
 Daisy Weston as Sister Brigitte
 Moses Rockman as Richard 
 Emily Booth as Williams Girl 
 Willow as herself 
 Laura Plair as Succubus
 Leasa Carlyon as Peasant 
 Louise Linehan as Marion
 Mary Grant as Nun
 Daisy Weston as Nun
 Leasa Carlyon as Nun
 Nicole Bouchet as Jailed Nun
 Louise Ross as Insane Nun
 Cindy Read as Dominatrix Nun 
 Michelle Thorne as Sister Sarah 
 Marc Morris as Inquisitor
 Chris Charlston as Inquisitor
 Hannah Callow as Sister Helena 
 Amanda Dawkins as Sister Mary 
 Majella Shepherd as Novice Catherine 
 Christopher Adamson as Father Peter 
 Philip Serfaty as Father James 
 Nicole Bouchet as Sister Helen 
 Cassandra Bochsler as Sister Teresa 
 Anneka Svenska as Sister Ann 
 Sarah McLean as Sister Jane 
 Cindy Read as Christa

External links 
 

British sexploitation films
1999 films
Nunsploitation films
1990s English-language films
1990s British films